Manuel Soto Loreto, known as Manuel Torre or Manuel Torres (1878 – 1933), was a Romani (Kalo) flamenco singer.

Beginning 

Torre was born in Jerez de la Frontera, Spain, in the neighbourhood of San Miguel, which together with the neighbourhood of Santiago, is a traditional centre of flamenco in Jerez. One of the most representative singers of Jerez, he was influenced by singers Manuel Molina, El Marrurro (from Jerez) and Enrique el Mellizo (from Cádiz). He developed his career in the cafés cantante of Seville. In his turn, he was one of the main influences in the work of singers like La Niña de los Peines, Antonio Mairena or Manuel Agujetas.

Career 

Torre was an honored guest, singing the siguiriyas, at the Concurso de Cante Jondo held at the Alhambra in Granada. This 1922 music festival was organized by Manuel de Falla to celebrate the flamenco arts. 

An encyclopedic singer, he excelled in siguiriyas, soleá, saetas, and fandangos. However, he rarely entered the recording studio, and his recordings are of irregular quality: 

The flamenco fans who have only listened to him in recordings only know his shadow, because he made all those recordings in a state of unconsciousness. (Mairena 1976)

He died in Seville, Spain.

Discography
Historic Recordings / Grabaciones históricas 1909-1931, Empresa Pública de Gestión, 1997 (Complete recordings)

Sources
ÁLVAREZ CABALLERO, Ángel: La discoteca ideal del flamenco, Editorial Planeta, Barcelona, 1995   

MAIRENA, Antonio: Confesiones de Antonio Mairena, Secretariado de Publicaciones de la Universidad de Sevilla, Seville, 1976

External links 

 Manuel Torre

1878 births
1933 deaths
Singers from Andalusia
Flamenco singers
People from Jerez de la Frontera
Spanish male singers
Spanish Romani people